This is a list of viceroys of the Kingdom of Valencia from 1520 to 1707.
 
1520 : Diego Hurtado de Mendoza, 1st Count of Melito 
1523 : Germaine of Foix and Johann of Brandenburg-Ansbach
1526 : Germaine of Foix and Ferdinand of Aragon, Duque de Calabria 
1537 : Ferdinand of Aragón, Duke of Calabria 
1550 : Lorenzo de Villarrasa (Interim)  (1st time)
1553 : Bernardino de Cárdenas y Pacheco, Duque de Maqueda 
1558 : Alfonso de Aragón, Duque de Segorbe 
1563 : Lorenzo de Villarrasa (2nd time)
1566 : Antonio Alfonso Pimentel de Herrera, Conde de Benavente 
1572 : Íñigo López de Hurtado de Mendoza, Marqués de Mondéjar 
1575 : Vespasiano Gonzaga y Colonna, Prínce of Sabbioneta 
1578 : Pedro Manrique de Lara, Duque de Nájera 
1580 : Francisco de Moncada y Folc de Cardona, Marqués de Aytona 
1595 : Francisco Gómez de Sandoval y Rojas, Marqués de Denia 
1598 : Juan Alfonso Pimentel de Herrera, Conde de Benavente 
1602 : Juan de Ribera, Archbishop of Valencia
1604 : Juan de Sandoval y Rojas, Marqués de Villamizar 
1606 : Luis Carrillo de Toledo, Marqués de Caracena 
1615 : Gómez Suárez de Figueroa, 3rd Duke of Feria
1618 : Antonio Pimentel y Toledo, Marqués de Tavara 
1622 : Enrique de  Ávila y Guzmán, Marqués de Povar 
1627 : Luis Ferrer de Cardona (Interim) 
1628 : Luis Fajardo Requesens y Zúñiga, Marqués de los Vélez 
1631 : Pedro Fajardo Requesens y Zúñiga, Marqués de los Vélez 
1635 : Fernando de Borja y Aragón, Marqués de Esquilache 
1640 : Federico Colonna, Príncipe de Butera 
1641 : Antonio de la Cerda, 7th Duke of Medinaceli
1642 : Francisco de Borja, Duque de Gandia 
1642 : Rodrigo Ponce de León, 4th Duke of Arcos 
1645 : Duarte Fernando Álvarez de Toledo, Conde de Oropesa 
1650 : Pedro de Urbina y Montoya, Archbishop of Valencia 
1652 : Luis Guillem de Moncada, Duque de Montalto 
1659 : Manuel Pérez de los Cobos, Marqués de Camarasa 
1663 : Vicente de Gonzaga y Doria 
1663 : Basilio de Castelví y Ponce (Interim) 
1664 : Antonio Pedro Álvarez Ossorio, Marqués de Astorga 
1666 : Gaspar Felipe de Guzmán y Mejía, 2nd Marquis of Leganés (died 1666). 
1667 : Diego Dávila Mesía y Guzmán, 3rd Marquis of Leganés 
1669 : Vespasiano Manrique de Lara Gonzaga, Conde de Paredes 
1675 : Francisco Idiáquez Butrón, Duque de Ciudad Real 
1678 : Juan Tomás de Rocaberti, Archbishop of Valencia (1st time)
1679 : Pedro Manuel Colón de Portugal, Duque de Veragua 
1680 : Rodrigo Manuel Fernández Manrique de Lara, Conde de Aguilar 
1683 : Juan Tomás de Rocaberti (2nd time)
1683 : Pedro José de Silva, Conde de Cifuentes 
1688 : Luis de Moscoso y de Osorio, Conde de Altamira 
1691 : Carlos Homo Dei Moura y Pacheco, Marqués de Castel Rodrigo 
1696 : Alfonso Pérez de Guzmán y Marañon 
1700 : Antonio Domingo de Mendoza Caamaño y Sotomayor, Marqués de Villagarcía

Viceroys named by Philip V of Spain
1705 : Joaquín Ponce de León 
1706 : Cristóbal de Moscoso y Montemayor, Conde de las Torres 
1707 : Luis Belluga Moncada, Bishop of Cartagena

Viceroys named by Charles of Habsburg
1705 : Juan Bautista Basset y Ramos 
1706 : Sancho Ruiz de Lihory, Count Cardona 
1706 : Diego Hurtado de Mendoza y Sandoval, Conde de la Corzana

References 
 Virreinato de Valencia

Valencia